Sathamba is a town located in Aravali district of the Indian state of Gujarat and the seat of a former petty princely state. It has a population of approximately 15,000.

History 

Sathamba was a princely state during the time of the British Raj. It then formed part of the Mahi Kantha Agency. Thakore Saheb Shri Sursinhji Ratansinhji signed the Instrument of Accession to merge the State of Sathamba into the Indian Union on 10 June 1948, to newly independent India, the Privy Purse being fixed at 18,800 Rupees.

Places of interest 
The village has a stepwell and a memorial stone with an inscription dated to 1269 AD {LAKHA VANZARA NI VAV}  (Samvat 1325).

Economy 
The major source of income for families is agriculture. There is also work in the quarry & stone crushing businesses surrounding the village, which comprise more than 30 companies. , the previously well-known cotton ginning and pressing factory of the village was struggling as a consequence of a series of annual droughts.

See also 
 Satamba, in Maharashtra

References

External links

Villages in Aravalli district